Tel Aviv Central Station may refer to:

Tel Aviv Central Bus Station
Tel Aviv Savidor Central Railway Station